The 2012–13 Tacoma Stars season was the third season of the Tacoma Stars professional indoor soccer club as a franchise in the Professional Arena Soccer League. The Stars, a Pacific Division team, played their home games in the new Pacific Sports Center in Tacoma, Washington. The team was led by head coach Joe Waters.

Season summary
The team had mixed results in the regular season, finishing 8–8, including the forfeit of their final scheduled game against the Sacramento Surge. The team struggled on the road with 6 of their 8 wins coming at home. Still, the Stars placed third in the PASL's five-team Pacific Division and only narrowly failed to qualify for the postseason.

The Stars participated in the 2012–13 United States Open Cup for Arena Soccer. They received a bye in the Wild Card round and defeated the Oregon Blacktails of the Premier Arena Soccer League in the Round of 16 before losing to the Las Vegas Legends in the Quarter-Finals, ending their tournament run.

Off-field moves
Between the 2011–12 and 2012–13 seasons, Tacoma Stars team owner Marian Bowers completed construction on a new  multi-sport facility on Tacoma's south side to replace the team's former home, the Tacoma Soccer Center. The Pacific Sports Center seats up to 1,200 spectators, includes 200 parking spaces, and cost approximately $4.2 million to construct. The April 2012 grand opening included free soccer clinics, appearances by Tacoma Stars players, and an "official first kick" by Joe Lonergan, then Deputy Mayor of Tacoma.

On January 19, 2013, the Stars announced a partnership with the local Special Olympics organization. The team hosted a match between the Sounders Special Olympics Unity team and the Tacoma Stars Special Olympics Unity team during halftime of the January 20, 2013, game as part of the Special Olympics Unified Sports campaign.

The Stars were originally scheduled to visit the Turlock Express on both January 25 and February 15, 2013. To reduce travel costs, the latter game was moved up to January 25 to form a doubleheader.

Before the start of the 2013–14 PASL season, the Tacoma franchise announced that it was putting itself on hiatus for at least one season and would return to the Premier Arena Soccer League as the Tacoma Galaxy.

Roster moves
In early September 2012, the Tacoma Stars signed veteran coach Joe Waters for the 2012–13 season. Waters played 8 seasons for the original Tacoma Stars in the 1980s and early 1990s.

The Stars held open tryouts on September 28 and 29, 2012, at the Pacific Sports Center.

Schedule

Regular season

2012–13 US Open Cup for Arena Soccer

References

External links
Tacoma Stars official website
Pacific Sports Center official website

Tacoma Stars (2003)
Tacoma Stars
Sports in Tacoma, Washington
Soccer in Washington (state)
Tacoma
Tacoma